Bzenica can refer to one of the following:

 Bzenica, a village in Požega-Slavonia County, Croatia
 Bzenica, a village in Banská Bystrica Region, Slovakia